Merriment is a 2000 album by Vic Chesnutt. The album is a collaborative effort between Georgia-based musicians Chesnutt and Kelly and Nikki Keneipp, with Chesnutt writing and singing the songs, and the Keneipps playing the music. It was released on the Keneipps' record label, Backburner Records, on August 29, 2000.

Reception 

Pitchfork Media gave Merriment an 8.0.

Track listing 
All songs written by Vic Chesnutt.

Musical accompaniment by Kelly and Nikki Keneipp.
 "Merriment" – 4:40
 "Fissle" – 2:46
 "Feather" – 2:46
 "Sunny Pasture" – 2:43
 "Preponderance" – 2:47
 "Haiku" – 2:46
 "Mighty Monkey" – 4:26
 "DNA" – 3:00
 "Deeper Currents" – 3:47
 "Merriment Reprise" – 4:04

References 

2000 albums
Vic Chesnutt albums